François Fauché is a French soloist singer specializing in baroque repertoire for bass.

Biography 
François Fauché worked a lot during the 1980s with the ensemble of baroque music Les Arts Florissants, spearhead of the baroqueux movement, conducted by William Christie.

He was then one of the pillars of this ensemble, alongside Agnès Mellon, Jill Feldman, Monique Zanetti, Guillemette Laurens,  Dominique Visse, Michel Laplénie, Étienne Lestringant, Philippe Cantor, Gregory Reinhart, Antoine Sicot etc.

He is a member of the Ensemble Clément Janequin conducted by Dominique Visse, with whom he took part in numerous concerts in France and abroad, as well as in numerous recordings.

He was also a member of the Ensemble Organum and the European ensemble William Byrd.

Discography (selection)

With Les Arts Florissants 
 1983 :  H.416 by Marc-Antoine Charpentier
 1983:  H.482 by Marc-Antoine Charpentier
 1984: Médée by Marc-Antoine Charpentier
 1986: Dido and Aeneas by Henry Purcell
 1986: Le Reniement de Saint Pierre H.424 by Marc-Antoine Charpentier
 1986: Méditations pour le Carême H.380-389 by Marc-Antoine Charpentier
 1987: Selva morale e spirituale by Claudio Monteverdi
 1989:  by Luigi Rossi
 1989: Te Deum by Marc-Antoine Charpentier
 1990: Le Malade Imaginaire H 495 by Marc-Antoine Charpentier
 Petits Motets by Jean-Baptiste Lully

With Ensemble Organum 
 Chants de l'Église de Rome - Période byzantine

With Ensemble Clément Janequin 
 1989: Pierre de La Rue : Missa L'Homme armé - Requiem
 1994: Une fête chez Rabelais

With Concert Spirituel 
 1997: Leçons de Ténèbres by Joseph Michel

External links 
 Website of ensemble Les Arts Florissants
 François Fauché on data.bnf.fr

French basses
Living people
Year of birth missing (living people)